This page lists many-eyed beings in mythology and fiction. The list is meant to include creatures that have multiple eyes on body or on head (or heads); for creatures who have multiple eyes due to having multiple heads, each having two eyes, see polycephaly in mythology.

In mythology and religion
 Amun in Egyptian mythology (in some depictions).
 Argus Panoptes in Greek mythology.
 Azrael in Islam.
 Bes in Egyptian mythology (in some depictions).
 Dodomeki in Japanese folklore.
 Ophanim in Christianity.
 Lord Shiva in Hinduism.
 Osiris in Egyptian mythology (in some depictions).
 Seraphim in Christianity.
 Indra in Hinduism (following his seduction of Ahalya).
 Durga or Gauri in Hinduism.

In fiction
 Blind Io from Discworld.
 Elder Things from the Cthulhu Mythos.
 Shoggoth from the Cthulhu Mythos
 Yith from the Cthulhu Mythos.
 Baskania from the book Erec Rex.
 Andalites from the Animorphs series have two eyes on their faces and two on stalks.
 The Rake from the board of 4chan in 2005. Has two glowing white eyes.

Movies and TV
 Eye Guy from the Power Rangers series.
 Angel of Death in Hellboy 2: The Golden Army, though it is based on Azrael.
 The Guardian from Big Trouble in Little China.
 Black Beast of Argh (also known as Black Beast Of Caerbannog) Monty Python and the Holy Grail.

Western animation
 Gallaxhar from Monsters vs. Aliens.
 Henry J. Waternoose from Monsters, Inc.
 Garnet from the Cartoon Network Animated Series Steven Universe.
 Malachite from the Cartoon Network Animated Series Steven Universe.
 Sardonyx from the Cartoon Network Animated Series Steven Universe.
 Rainbow Quartz from the Cartoon Network Animated Series Steven Universe.
 Tom Lucitor from the Disney Animated Series Star vs. The Forces of Evil.
 Jake, from Season 10 of the Cartoon Network animated series Adventure Time.
 Nibblonians from Futurama.
 Vaka-Waka, a Muncho mixel from Mixels.

Games
 Amygdala and Rom, the Vacuous Spider, both bosses from Bloodborne.
 Ardata Carmia from Hiveswap.
 Beholder and related monsters from Dungeons & Dragons.
 Muffet from Undertale.

Anime and manga
 Hiei from Yu Yu Hakusho.
 Hyakume from GeGeGe no Kitarō.
 3 Of the digimon sovereigns have 4 eyes on their heads from Digimon.
 Huanlongmon has 8 eyes from Digimon.
 Rachnera Arachnera from Monster Musume has six eyes, being part spider.
 Pai, a Sanjiyan Unkara from the manga 3×3 Eyes.
 Thousand-Eyes Idol from Yu-Gi-Oh!.
 Alucard's familiar, "Black hound of Baskerville" in Hellsing Ultimate.
 Claydol, from Pokémon.
 Kokushibo, a character from Demon Slayer: Kimetsu no Yaiba.
 Charlotte Pudding, a Human-Three Eye hybrid from One Piece.

See also
 List of one-eyed creatures
 Multiocular O

References

Many-eyed
Eye 2
Legendary creatures with supernumerary body parts